Yelifanovskaya Vystavka is a rural locality (a village) in Ilezskoye Rural Settlement, Tarnogsky District, Vologda Oblast, Russia. The population was 8 as of 2002.

Geography 
Yelifanovskaya Vystavka is located 33 km northeast of Tarnogsky Gorodok (the district's administrative centre) by road. Yelifanovskaya is the nearest rural locality.

References 

Rural localities in Tarnogsky District